The Poacher Diaries is a split album released by the bands Agoraphobic Nosebleed and Converge in 1999. It was remastered by Scott Hull in 2006 and re-released by Relapse Records. 

In 2022, Converge's side of the split was reissued as a standalone EP, The Poacher Diaries Redux, with mixing by Kurt Ballou, remastering by Alan Douches, and new artwork inspired by the original by Randy Ortiz.

Track listing

The Poacher Diaries
Agoraphobic Nosebleed
 "Mantis" – 1:26
 "Center of the Hive" – 1:13
 "Glass Tornado" – 1:02
 "Landfills of Extinct Possibility" – 1:11
 "Pentagram Constellation" – 2:18
 "Bed of Flies" – 1:01
 "Destroyed" – 1:07
 "Gringo" – 1:19
 "Infected Womb" – 2:59

Converge
 "Locust Reign" – 1:28
 "This Is Mine" – 1:34
 "They Stretch for Miles" – 4:26
 "My Great Devastator" – 5:00
 "The Human Shield" – 3:45
 "Minnesota" – 5:07

The Poacher Diaries Redux
Converge
 "Locust Reign" – 1:24
 "This Is Mine" – 1:32
 "They Stretch for Miles" – 4:10
 "My Great Devastator" – 4:54
 "The Human Shield" – 3:44
 "Minnesota" – 5:13

Personnel

Agoraphobic Nosebleed
J.R. Hayes – vocals
Scott Hull – guitar, drum programming
Jay Randall – vocals, electronics

Converge
Kurt Ballou – guitar, vocals
Aaron Dalbec – guitar, vocals
John Digiorgio – drums
Nate Newton – bass guitar, vocals
Jacob Bannon – vocals

References

External links
 The Poacher Diaries and The Poacher Diaries Redux at Bandcamp (streamed copies where licensed)

Agoraphobic Nosebleed albums
Converge (band) albums
Hardcore punk EPs
Grindcore EPs
1999 albums
Hydra Head Records albums
Split albums
Relapse Records albums
Albums produced by Kurt Ballou